Haley Glacier is a glacier,  long, draining southeast along the north side of Rowley Massif into Odom Inlet, on the east coast of Palmer Land, Antarctica. It was mapped by United States Geological Survey in 1974, and was named by the Advisory Committee on Antarctic Names for Philip H. Haley, a United States Antarctic Research Program biologist at Palmer Station, 1973.

References

Glaciers of Palmer Land